Boondael railway station is a railway station in Ixelles, Brussels run by the National Railway Company of Belgium. The station lies on line 26 between the Delta and Vivier d'Oie railway stations, respectively in the municipalities of Auderghem and Uccle.

The station offers a connection with tram routes 8 and 25. The stop is the terminus of route 25.

Train services
The station is served by the following service(s):

Intercity services (IC-27) Brussels Airport - Brussels-Luxembourg - Nivelles - Charleroi (weekdays)
Brussels RER services (S5) Mechelen - Brussels-Luxembourg - Etterbeek - Halle - Enghien (- Geraardsbergen) (weekdays)
Brussels RER services (S7) Mechelen - Merode - Halle (weekdays)
Brussels RER services (S9) Leuven - Brussels-Luxembourg - Etterbeek - Braine-l'Alleud (weekdays, peak hours only)

References
 Belrail

Ixelles
Railway stations in Brussels
Railway stations opened in 1973